Macchia, or maquis, is a shrubland biome in the Mediterranean region.

Macchia, and its plural Macchie, may also refer to several places in Italy:

Settlements

Comuni
Macchia d'Isernia, Province of Isernia, Molise
Macchia Valfortore, Province of Campobasso, Molise

Frazioni
Macchia, Cerreto di Spoleto
Macchia, Giarre, Sicily
Macchia, Montecorvino Rovella, Campania
Macchie, Castelsantangelo sul Nera, Marche
Macchie, Castiglione del Lago, Umbria
Le Macchie, Arcidosso, Tuscany

Other
Macchie railway station, Bari, Apulia